Airbag is an Argentine hard rock band formed in 1999 and consists of three brothers: Patricio Sardelli (lead guitar, piano and vocals), Gastón Sardelli (bass guitar and backing vocals) and Guido Sardelli (drums, rhythm guitar and vocals). They have released five studio albums and one live album and toured mostly around Latin America.

History

Beginnings (1999–2003)
Originally from Don Torcuato town in Buenos Aires Province, they started playing songs from Deep Purple, The Beatles, Guns N' Roses, Chuck Berry, Green Day and Blink 182. In 2003 they signed with Warner Music for the release of their debut album.

Airbag (2004)
Their first album went gold and platinum in Argentina. It was recorded at the ION studios in Buenos Aires, on tape, which gave it a particular sound, with characteristics of rock from the 1980s. When reality TV dominated the media, this band made its way by writing their own songs and renewing the trust of record companies that only bet on television projects. The album was recorded and mixed in just one week.

They were awarded by MTV as New Artists and by Rolling Stone magazine readers as Revelation Band. The songs "The gypsy's departure", "I want to be with you", "Only here" and "I don't remember anymore" (all by Patricio Sardelli), led the rankings of your country as well as neighboring ones. 

After a tour of Argentina, Paraguay, Bolivia, Uruguay, Chile and Ecuador, among other countries, they performed two functions at the Gran Rex from Buenos Aires, selling out tickets and marking a milestone in Argentine music, since a long time ago that a garage band that came out of playing in bars with only one album had not achieved this call.

Blanco y Negro (2006)
At the beginning of 2006, Airbag traveled to Spain to record their second album, Blanco y Negro, which was presented at the Luna Park Stadium to a full house. That same year they also participated in the soundtrack of Alma Pirata with the song "A whole life waiting for you". Instrumentally, the album is a continuation of what was his debut album. Many songs were from the same era of said album since the group never stopped playing in that period.

In addition, the band traveled to Chile for the release of their new album and carried out promotional activities.

That album took them on a tour of Ecuador, Colombia, Bolivia, Peru and Mexico. In 2007 they won the MTV Awards as "Best Newcomer Artists of the South".

Una Hora a Tokyo (2008) 
Airbag decided to finish the tour and dedicate himself to working on new songs, which he could not achieve with the previous album. Thus, at the end of 2007, he began to work on the first melodies that would be part of Una Hora a Tokyo , the third studio album, in honor of a notorious speech given by the former president Carlos Saúl Menem in August 1996, where an alleged plan by the State was mentioned to create a system of ships that were going to travel to the stratosphere and in one hour to be in Tokyo or Paris.

An hour to Tokyo featured major changes in the band. Guido decided that he would continue to record drums but in live performances he would be the rhythm guitar and voice of various songs. The songs "My sensation", "Revolution" and "Far from the sun" have him as the protagonist as a singer.

This album generated a new stage in the band's career, both musically and structurally, since they entered into a legal conflict with their former manager and, tired of the ways of the industry, they decided to go their own way and also break with the record label Warner. One of the first concerts in which they participated with "Una hora a Tokyo" was at the ALAS solidarity festival with Shakira, Alejandro Sanz and 13TH Street. That same year, he was nominated for Grammy Awards for "Best Rock Album" and "Best Rock Song." They traveled to Las Vegas for the event held at MGM.

Vorágine (2011) 
After at least two years of standing after bringing his ex-manager to trial and the final end with the multinational Warner Music the trio began work on what would become their fourth album.

Patricio explained to the magazine Yes! from Clarín that while they fixed the whole situation they had plenty of time to compose the new songs for the album (they have composed almost 100 of which 12 were included on the album), and finally they were released completely independently.

On September 20, 2011, his new album, Vorágine, was released. It was officially presented at the Gran Rex Theater on December 7, 2011, to a full house. With this show began the recording of his next DVD, for which images of his shows have also been recorded so far at La Trastienda de Buenos Aires, at the Teatro Broadway de Rosario and other cities of his national tour. They have shared the stage with this album in shows with Calle 13 Lime gives guest of the shows of Noel Gallagher in Argentina for the cities of Córdoba and Buenos Aires.

In August 2012 they released the video for the song "Cae el Sol", directed by Patricio Sardelli and Gabriel Grieco, which was a hit on all radio stations in the country. And the video had a lot of repercussion as it dealt in depth with the subject of "human trafficking", trying to raise awareness on the subject.

In October he traveled to Chile to begin his tour of Hispanoamérica at the "Movistar Arena" in Santiago, in November they returned to Argentina to perform four shows at the Theater Vorterix from Buenos Aires to a full house.

From this period on, Patricio will be the director of all the band's video clips.

In the middle of his tour, he participated in the festival held by social organizations demanding justice for Mariano Ferreyra. They will also present themselves providing support to the relatives of the Eleven 2012 railway accident.

Samsara (2012)
After a lot of live performances and the recording of his first live CD-DVD titled Samsara, he set about recording what will be his fifth album. Samsara was filmed on December 7, 2011, and corresponds to the presentation of the album Voragine. It was filmed entirely in HD at the Teatro Gran Rex and other presentations.

Libertad (2013)
In November 2013, they released Libertad, the fifth studio album. The first single released is Por mil noches and then Libertad as side B. They undertook a tour of the interior of the country, after playing two nights at the Estadio Luna Park. They received two Grammy nominations and won an award from MTV Europe for "Best Latin Artist."

Five video clips were released from this album: "Por mil noches", "Noches de insomnio", "Todo pasa", "Fugitivo" and "Sonidos criminales", who won two awards for the best video clip of the year 2015, for the television network Quiero Música, "Best video band" and for the digital magazine stereomusica.com "Best video clip of the year.

That same year they also participated in the soundtrack of the film Still Life (film premiered at the Cannes Festival 2014), with the song of the same name and its corresponding video clip. Patricio acted in some scenes of the film.

In the song Fugitivo, Ricardo Mollo recorded the guitar solo.

Mentira La Verdad (2016)
In 2016, they released their new album called Mentira la Verdad, presenting it in September of that year, on a tour that began in the Luna Park and spread throughout the country . The first single from this album was "Vivamos El Momento", a song that was a success, leading the Spotify charts at the time.

On September 15, the album was presented to the press and finally, on September 16, it took to the streets with a record signing in the Musimundo of Callao and Corrientes. The long line of fans of the band had been camping since the day before and surprisingly the Airbags brought them pizzas at midnight.

This same one after no Argentine band is accepted by the production of the Guns N' Roses, which is summoned to be their opening band in the two concerts they gave at the River Plate Stadium. After this presentation, the same Guns N' Roses musicians announced in the United States the live power of the Argentine band.

After running out of seats in three presentations at Luna Park with "Libertad", on October 1 they presented the new album live, again to a full house at Luna Park. There the band announced the tour that would follow after that presentation. They were in Tucumán, Salta, Córdoba, Rosario, Mendoza , among other provinces. They closed 2016 with a historic event for the history of the band, to be selected to play at the reopening of the legendary Obras Sanitarias Stadium.

After a great year, in 2017 they came up with an almost impossible bet for the Argentine music scene that they undertook a project that consisted of mixing rock with classical music, whose first live test took place at the Usina del Arte and it was a complete success. without input a crowd of followers.

That same year they were the band chosen by Bon Jovi for the opening of their shows at the Vélez Sarfield Stadium.

They held a series of concerts at the Vorterix Theater every Friday in June, selling out the tickets for the 5 shows within hours of going on sale.

On December 8 they presented a recital called "Sinfónico Ultra" that mixed rock and classical music. The recital was held with 60 musicians on stage, at Luna Park, selling out all tickets. On this occasion, a concert was staged with a staging not seen so far in the country in a context of classical music and rock.

In 2018, the band started the year debuting at the Festival "Cosquín Rock" in the city of the same name in Córdoba in February.

In March they play again in Lima, after not going to Peru in 11 years, as well as Mexico where they are invited to play in the "Vive Latino" from Mexico.

In April of that year, the band returns to the Sanitary Works Stadium under the "Rock N 'Chop" festival together with Attaque 77, and after this, the cycle of Mentira La Verdad.

Prelude to a new album (2018-2021)
In September 2018 they publish "Como Un Diamante" as a single preview of their next album and present it at the Vorterix Theater a few days, and in October they travel again to Peru and Mexico to present it, and in November a new advance called Así de Fácil is published, and in December they present them on two dates at the Vorterix Theater saying goodbye to the year.

In 2019 in the month of February they made their debut at the "Rock en Baradero" festival. In June they return to Mexico, the following month to Peru and in August to Uruguay.

In September they launch "Über Puber" and (the following month) "Lost"; that same month they opened for Muse at the Palermo Hippodrome in front of more than 12,000 people. In the month of December they return to Colombia after several years, also for the "Jingle Bell Rock Festival" and as usual they close the year with a double at the Vorterix Theater.

In 2020 they start the year strong when they appear on the main stage of the "Cosquín Rock" of Córdoba and are invited to play at festivals such as Lollapalooza from Argentina, Uruguay, Paraguay, Spain, your first visit to the United States and more countries, plus the publication of his next album, but due to the global pandemic of COVID-19 he delayed the plans.

That same month they started with a lives section on YouTube and Twitch called "Airbag Live Show", while the 2020 quarantine lasted; while they continue with the recording of their next album, in September they perform their first streaming show from the Vorterix Theater with the premiere of a new advance song entitled "Mila, Saturno y el Río". In December they say goodbye to the year in Mandarine Park.

In May 2021 they published as a single a cover of "La balada del diablo y la muerte" by the Argentine band La Renga as a commemoration of the 25 years of the album Despedazado por mil partes by 1996 of the band.

Al parecer todo ha sido una trampa (2021-present)
On September 23, 2021, a new single "Intoxicarme" (with video clip) is released. On October 13, "Pensamientos" is published, achieving a lot of repercussion.

The album released on October 15, containing 17 tracks, including "Perdido", "Como Un Diamante", "Pensamientos" and a duet song with Los Enanitos Verdes called Volver a casa.

The presentation of the album was on  November 5, 6 and 7 at the Teatro Gran Rex, and it went through various parts of the interior of the country and abroad for 2022. In several interviews, the members of the band have said that the album aims to have a concept throughout its 17 songs, and that it was made in 3 different sessions, between 2018 and 2021, so the list of songs and the same album mutated in various ways.

Discography

StudioAirbag (2004)Blanco Y Negro (2006)Una Hora a Tokyo (2008)Voragine (2011)Libertad (2013)Mentira La Verdad (2016)Al Parecer Todo Ha Sido Una Trampa (2021)

LiveSamsara'' (2012)

References

External links
 Official website

Argentine hard rock musical groups
MTV Europe Music Award winners